Wanne is a residential area in the northern outskirts of the city of Tübingen, Germany. It is situated on a slope facing south and is very popular with people working at the Morgenstelle, a large complex of university buildings on the opposite slope, or at the cluster of university hospitals that extend further south of these buildings. To the north of Wanne lies the vast state nature protection area of the Schönbuch. Wanne is popular as a residential area because of its vicinity to the nature reserve, its elevation and southern exposure. However, it does not have many shops and it is somewhat inconvenient to go to the historic city center of Tübingen.

Tübingen (district)
Boroughs of Tübingen